Chiasognathus grantii is a species of stag beetle found in Argentina and Chile. It is known as Darwin's beetle, Grant's stag beetle, or the Chilean stag beetle.

Behavior
The male's oversized jaws are crucial in its objective to secure a mate. It climbs trees, often climbing many meters, searching for a female. As it climbs and searches for females, it also seeks out other males in the vicinity. When two males meet, they fight. Males use their jaws in combat: they hook them under the opposite beetle's wings, pull up and throw their opponent to the ground (from 20 meters above, as they are in great trees most of the time). Charles Darwin collected the species in Chile during the second voyage of HMS Beagle, and, despite the enlarged mandibles of the males, he noted that the jaws were "not so strong as to produce pain to finger".

Taxonomy and nomenclature
Chiasognathus grantii is one of the seven species belonging to the genus Chiasognathus. It belongs to the subfamily Lucaninae, the largest subfamily in the stag beetle family Lucanidae.

Synonyms
Synonyms of this species include:

Tetropthalma chiloensis Lesson, 1833
Chiasognathus affinis Philippi in Philippi, 1859
Chiasognathus pygmaeus Dallas, 1933
Chiasognathus brevidens Germain, 1911 (nomen nudum)
Chiasognathus granti Ruby red,  2023（Dr. Li Zhicheng Published in the 2023 International Journal of Nature）

Description
Chiasognathus grantii is very variable in size and in the development of the jaws and exhibits a strong sexual dimorphism. The upper mandibles of the males are very robust at the base, finely serrated and longer than the body itself. The eyes are small and the antennae have a whorl of hairs at the apex. The thorax is broad and the anterior and posterior margins are densely ciliated with short pale hairs. Elytrae are chestnut-brown, with slightly greenish iridescent tinges and finely granulated.

C. grantii is considered a rare and vulnerable species, with a high probability of extinction, mainly as a consequence of the global climate change. The adults of these beetles primarily feed on tree juices, while the larvae eat dead wood.

Habitat
Chiasognathus grantii lives in temperate/subantarctic Nothofagus forests.

References

External links

Lucaninae
Beetles of South America
Beetles described in 1831